Every Silver Lining Has a Cloud is an album by painter Julian Schnabel, recorded in 1993 and released in 1995 on Island Records. The majority of the album was written by Schnabel himself with most lyrics dealing with love.

The recording personnel included Bill Laswell and his frequent collaborators Buckethead, Bernie Worrell, Nicky Skopelitis and Anton Fier. The release received mixed reviews.

Track listing
All lyrics by Julian Schnabel; except track 13

Personnel
Julian Schnabel - organ, piano, vocals, backing vocals 
Bernie Worrell - organ, piano, backing vocals
Julian Bernard Fowler - piano, backing vocals on "I Tried" and "When I Was Young"
Gary Oldman - piano, vocals on "When I Was Young", voices on "Every Silver Lining Has a Cloud"
Ted Daniel - flugelhorn on "Juan Belmonte"
Buckethead - guitar, backing vocals
Carey Burtt - guitar on "I Wanna Take You Home" and "It's Great to Be Nine"
Brian Kelly - soprano guitar on "The Night We Met", guitar on "Carey Came Back"
Brandon Ross - guitar, piano, backing vocals
Michael Wincott - guitar on "Apartment #9", harmonica on "Carey Came Back"
Nicky Skopelitis - rhythm guitar, piano, backing vocals
Electra Stewart - violin, piano, backing vocals on "The Night We Met"
Michelle Kinney - cello, piano, backing vocals
Bill Laswell - bass, piano, backing vocals
Anton Fier - drums, backing vocals
Barkisu - vocals on "Carey Came Home"
Henry Threadgill - string and brass arrangements
Technical
Robert Musso - engineer
Imad Mansour - assistant engineer
Oz Fritz - engineer, mixing
Howie Weinberg - mastering
Julian Schnabel - art direction
Brian Kelly - design

References

External links

1995 debut albums
Julian Schnabel albums
Island Records albums
Albums produced by Bill Laswell